Okhotny Ryad is a street located in Tverskoy District of Moscow. It runs from Manezhnaya Square to Theatre Square and it also lies between Georgievsky Lane and Nikolskaya Street. The numbering of houses is carried out from Manezhnaya Square.

Notable buildings
Okhotny Ryad is the location of the Building of Council of Labor and Defense, which has housed the State Duma since 1994, having previously housed the Council of Labor and Defense, Council of People's Commissars of the Soviet Union, Council of Ministers of the Soviet Union and Gosplan. The House of the Unions is also located on the corner of Bolshaya Dmitrovka and Okhotny Ryad streets.

References

Streets in Moscow